Haider A. Khan is a professor of economics at the Josef Korbel School of International Studies at the University of Denver. He has been widely recognized for his expertise on social accounting matrix (SAM)-based economic modeling, which he employs to study problems in international economics and development.  His areas of research include poverty and inequality, environment, foreign aid, trade and investment, as well as economy-wide modeling.  Khan is listed among the top five percent of almost 14,000 professional contributors to IDEAS, and his report on women's rights as human rights is among the top ten in the category of political theory and political behavior on the SSRN website.

A significant number of Khan's works discuss the issues of regional cooperation and governance, the impacts of democratization on economic growth and economic development, human capabilities and the role they play on individual wellbeing.  More recently, Khan has been working internationally on the development of the Theory of Deep Democracy, which he has thus far applied to his proactive studies of Bangladesh's model of governance, as well as his studies of women's rights as human rights. He has worked closely with the International Labor Office, the Ford Foundation, the World Bank, the UNU-WIDER Project, the UNDP, and the Asian Development Bank.

Education
Dr. Khan received his Masters and Ph,D. at Cornell University. He attended Eisenhower College for his undergraduate education and graduated Summa Cum Laude in economics, mathematics, and philosophy. He subsequently went on complete his graduate work at Cornell University, where he began his work on social accounting matrices. During this time he won awards to research technology and income distribution in South Korea and Indonesia.

Life and work
Prior to his current work at the Josef Korbel School, Dr. Khan was also a visiting professor at Tokyo University and a visiting scholar at Hitotsubashi University, Tilburg University, People’s University in Beijing and UNU-WIDER. He has served as a senior economic adviser to UNCTAD in Geneva. He was also a distinguished visiting fellow at the Asian Development Bank Institute, Tokyo and an adviser to the Asian Development Bank. His major areas of expertise are globalization, economic and econometric modeling, economic theory, international and development economics and political economy. His work ranges from economy-wide modeling of technology and capital flows to the political and economic theories of democracy and justice. He has published twelve books and more than one hundred articles in professional journals. His work on East Asian Development has received wide recognition. Some of his books and articles have been translated in several other languages. He writes op. eds.  and appears on TV and radio programs in many parts of the world as a public intellectual. Prof. Khan has received the prestigious Distinguished Scholar Award from the Academy of International Business and delivered an invited address on “An evolutionary approach to reconstructing the global financial architecture: the extended panda’s thumb principle” at the annual meeting in Dallas. He has also won awards and delivered invited addresses in Costa Rica, Mexico, Canada, Switzerland, The Netherlands, Spain, Greece, Finland, Egypt, Jordan, Turkey, India, China, and Japan among other countries..He has delivered papers at the United Nations and other international organizations on several occasions. Prof. Khan is also an award-winning poet, translator, and literary critic. His early career was in theater, television, radio, and film where he participated in a number of progressive democratic and anti-imperialist projects. He  has written books and articles on Modernism, Surrealism and Postmodernism in film and literature, and on Octavio Paz, James Joyce, Guillaume Apollinaire, Rabindranath Tagore, Modern Japanese Poetry  and the Japanese Haiku and Renku master Basho, among others, in English and several other languages. Below are some excerpts of Dr. Khan's work:
 "A Conversation with Amartya Sen" - Dr. Khan sat down for a wide-ranging conversation with Dr. Amartya Sen in October 1992, discussing his personal history and approach to economics.
 HK: "Let us go to some specific questions with regards to your work on poverty and famine. Your theoretical paper on poverty appeared in Econometrica in 1976."
 AS: "Yes. It was not the first, however. Economic and Political Weekly published an earlier version in 1973. There was a slightly different axiomatization in the Econometrica paper. I was concerned with the fact that people measuring poverty left out so many features. Measures such as headcount do not say anything about how poor the poor are, or the inequality between them. I was also worried that in terms of politics of poverty measurement, all governments are interested in pushing up people who are close to the poverty line, because with the least effort you get them above the poverty line and you get a lot of credit for reduction of the poverty level if it is measured just by the headcount. But if you take into account how far you are below the line, then a measure which takes not of that should be more sensitive to the bigger challenge of poverty. I was pleased to see that this axiomatization lead to a relatively simple and meaningful statistical measure." 
 "Deepening democracy in an age of crisis: building on an ontology of difference",  opening paragraphs.
 "It is almost a cliché now to talk of crisis. However, the short term global economic crisis which combines the deflation of popular assets  with steep inflation in essential cost-of-living items, especially fuel and food, threatens to linger. The longer term crisis of climate change and global catastrophe by a combination of natural disasters and the failures of global economics and politics of neoliberalism become more threatening as years go by without serious action. The main thesis of this paper is that deepening democracy globally by taking ecological, economic and social factors underlying the transition from elite politics to genuine people's politics is the only viable way out of this constellation of crises. For this purpose, I propose  a somewhat novel theory of deep democracy from a political and social economy perspective.  In deep democracy, democratic practices have to become institutionalized in such a way that they become part of normal life in a democratic society. Ontologically, deep democracy overlaps with Barber's (1984) idea of strong democracy. There are, however, epistemological differences as well as differences of emphasis, particularly in the economic sphere. Cluster conditions for deep democracy include both cultural-political and socio-economic conditions. My idea of deep democracy is consistent with a Deleuzian ontology of the differential basis of diversity with important connections to Spinoza and Bergson."

Affiliated institutions
Prof. Khan received his M.A. and Ph.D. from Cornell University. His fields were economic theory, econometrics and economic development. His undergraduate degree is summa cum laude in mathematics, philosophy and economics from Eisenhower College. He is now a distinguished professor of economics at the Josef Korbel School of International Studies, University of Denver. He has been affiliated in various capacities with the UN, the World Bank, ILO, UNU, Universities and research institutes in Western Europe, China, Japan, India, Indonesia, Costa Rica and Mexico.

During his journey in Italy in November 2017, as visiting professor, he espoused his eight propositions about "crisis and globalization" during a "lectio magistralis"  in Santa Maria Capua Vetere at the Universitá degli Studi della Campania Luigi Vanvitelli with the collaboration of two Italian economics professors, Salvatore D'Acunto and Francesco Schettino, giving all together a great contribute to the different aspects of the question.

Books 

 Transitional Economies and Regional Economic Development Strategies, UNCRD, 1996.
 Technology, Energy and Development, Edward Elgar,1997.
 Technology Systems and Development, Macmillan, 1997.
 African Debt and Sustainable Development, Phelps-Stokes Fund Monograph, 1997.
 Technology, Democracy, and Development, Edward Elgar,1998.
Innovation and Growth in East Asia: the Future of Miracles, Palgrave/Macmillan, 2004.
Global Markets and Financial Crises: Asia's Mangled Miracle, Palgrave/Macmillan, 2004.
Poverty Strategies in Asia (with John Weiss), Edward Elgar, 2007.
 Reducing Poverty:Patterns of Potential Human Progress, Oxford University Press, (with Barry Hughes et als.), 2008.
 China’s National Innovation System at the Cross-roads, LAP Lambert Academic Publishing, Berlin, Germany (with Alberto Gabriele), 2010.

Online lectures
 Resource Curse and Global Justice: The Tragedy in Middle East, Dr. Haider Khan
 Using SAM-based & CGE Models for Policy Analysis: Part 4
 Using SAM-based & CGE Models for Policy Analysis: Part 3
 Using SAM-based & CGE Models for Policy Analysis: Part 2
 Using SAM-based & CGE Models for Policy Analysis: Part 1
 SAMs, Modeling and Gender: Part 3
 SAMs, Modeling and Gender: Part 2
 SAMs, Modeling and Gender: Part 1
 Global Crisis, Human Security and Human Capabilities - Haider Khan, Ph.D.
 Dr. Haider Khan performs music and lectures at Lamont School of Music

Select papers
 Corporate Governance of Family Businesses in Asia: What's Right and What's Wrong?
 Impact of foreign aid on the fiscal behavior of LDC governments
 Publicly available papers on MPRA

References 

21st-century American economists
Josef Korbel School of International Studies people
University of Denver faculty
Living people
Year of birth missing (living people)